This is a list of members of the third Parliament of Lebanon, serving from 1934 to 1937.

List of members

Legislative Speakers

References 

Lists of members of the Parliament of Lebanon by term